Catherine Seulki Kang (born 25 September 1987) is a South Korean-born naturalized Central African taekwondo practitioner. She competed at the 2012 Summer Olympics in the Women's 49 kg event. On 8 August, she was defeated in the preliminary round against Lucija Zaninović of Croatia.

Personal life
Kang was born in Gunsan, Jeonbuk province and resides at Busan in South Korea. She graduated from Gyeonggi Science High School and Woosuk University.

Career
While working as Taekwondo instructor in Belgium, Kang decided to switch nationality in 2010 to Central African Republic to try to qualify for the 2012 Summer Olympic Games.

In 2012, Kang become the first taekwondo athlete to win a medal while representing Central African Republic in an international event. She won the bronze medal in the WU Taekwondo Championship 2012 which was held in her native country South Korea at Pocheon.

Kang also works as a Taekwondo coach for the Antioquia team competing in La Liga Antioqueña de Taekwondo at Medellín, Colomba.

References

External links

1987 births
Living people
People from Gunsan
Sportspeople from North Jeolla Province
Sportspeople from Busan
South Korean Christians
South Korean female taekwondo practitioners
Central African Republic female taekwondo practitioners
Taekwondo practitioners at the 2012 Summer Olympics
Olympic taekwondo practitioners of the Central African Republic
Naturalized citizens of Central African Republic
South Korean expatriates in Colombia